The Profession of Arms is a 2001 Italian film directed by Ermanno Olmi.

Plot
In autumn of 1526, Emperor Charles V sends his German landsknechts led by Georg von Frundsberg to march towards Rome. The inferior papal armies, commanded by Giovanni de' Medici, try to  chase them in the midst of a harsh winter. Nevertheless, the Imperial armies manage to cross the rivers along their march and get cannons thanks to the maneuvers of its Lords.

In a skirmish, Giovanni de' Medici is wounded in the leg by a falconet shot. The attempts to cure him fail and he dies. The Imperial armies assault Rome.

The film is beautifully but unassumingly set, and shows the hard conditions in which war is waged and its lack of glory. It ends straightforwardly with the declaration made after the death of Giovanni de' Medici by the commanders of the armies in Europe of ceasing to use firearms because of their cruelty.

Cast
 Hristo Zhivkov - Giovanni de Medici
 Sergio Grammatico - Federico Gonzaga
 Dimitar Rachkov - Luc'Antonio Cuppano
 Fabio Giubbani - Matteo Cusastro
 Sasa Vulicevic - Pietro Aretino
 Desislava Tenekedjieva - Maria Salviati de Medici
 Sandra Ceccarelli - Nobildonna di Mantova
 Franco Andreani - Ambasciatore di Carlo V

Awards
 9 David di Donatello Awards (Best Film - Best Director: Ermanno Olmi - Best Screenplay: Ermanno Olmi - Best Producer: Luigi Musini, Roberto Cicutto and Ermanno Olmi - Best Production Design: Luigi Marchione - Best Cinematography: Fabio Olmi - Best Costume Design: Francesca Sartori - Best Editing: Paolo Cottignola - Best Music: Fabio Vacchi)
 3 Nastro d'Argento Prizes (Best Production Design: Luigi Marchione - Best Cinematography: Fabio Olmi - Best Costume Design: Francesca Sartori)
 Palme d'Or (nominated) - 2001 Cannes Film Festival

See also 
Condottieri (1937)
The Violent Patriot (1956)

References

External links

2001 films
2000s historical drama films
Italian historical drama films
Films directed by Ermanno Olmi
Films set in the 1520s
Films shot in Bulgaria
2001 drama films
2000s Italian films
2000s Italian-language films